Gang He is an expert on energy and environmental policy. He is an assistant professor at Stony Brook University, as well as a faculty affiliate with the International Energy Analysis Department of Lawrence Berkeley National Laboratory.

Education 
He received his undergraduate degree in geography from Peking University. He was known as one of the few Chinese students who were first selected to attend the UNFCCC CoP11 Youth Summit as a youth delegate. He continued to pursue a Master of Arts at Columbia University in Climate and Society. After graduating, he worked at the Program on Energy and Sustainable Development in Stanford University. In 2010, he moved to the University of California, Berkeley, where he earned Ph.D. degree in Energy and Resources, in 2015.

Career 
In 2015, Dr. He joined the faculty at Stony Brook University. His research group focuses on energy and environmental policy, energy systems modeling, energy and climate change, and energy transition. He has investigated the drivers of clean power transition and how renewable costs decrease could accelerate the transition. He also studied the just transition away from coal in China. His recent work examines data-driven methods to study the nexus interactions and impact of clean power transition. He has testified on the impact of clean energy transition in the New York State Senate Hearings On The Climate and Community Leaders Protection Act (signed into law as The Climate Leadership and Community Protection Act (CLCPA)). He has served in the National Offshore Wind R&D Consortium's R&D Advisory Group (RDAG). He has also engaged in the U.S.-China collaboration on energy and climate change led by Asia Society.

Professional recognition 
 2019 Information Technology and Innovation Foundation Scholar
 2013 Institute for New Economic Thinking Young Scholar 2013
 2011 Aspen Environment Forum Scholar 2011 
 2008 Cynthia Helms Fellow, World Resources Institute
 2007 Asia 21 Young Leaders, Asia Society 
 2005 Youth Delegate to UNFCCC CoP11/MoP1

Selected publications 
 
 
 
 

Dr. He's work has been regularly cited in media, including in Nature (journal), Forbes, Scientific American, National Geographic, The Seattle Times, E&E News, InsideClimate News, The Guardian, The New York Times.

References 

Living people
Stony Brook University faculty
University of California, Berkeley alumni
Peking University alumni
Year of birth missing (living people)